The New Fraternal Jewish Association was founded in Toronto in January 1960 by approximately 200 former members of the United Jewish People's Order who had left UJPO for not being critical enough of the Soviet Union. The split was the culmination of four years of debate within the Communist-aligned UJPO after revelations by J. B. Salsberg of the extent of antisemitism in the Soviet Union under Stalin and Khrushchev. Founded by Sam Lipshitz and Morris Biderman but led through much of its existence by Salsberg, the NFJA functioned as a left-wing, pro-Israel and non-Communist fraternal organization. Salsberg served as president of NFJA several times and wrote a column in its publication, Fraternally Yours. Lipshitz edited Fraternally Yours from 1960 until his death in 2000.

References

Non-profit organizations based in Toronto
Jewish Canadian history
Jewish organizations based in Canada
Jewish political organizations
Jewish socialism
Jews and Judaism in Toronto
Secular Jewish culture in Canada
Zionism in Canada